Devon Drayton (14 September 1888 – 27 November 1941) was a cricketer from British Guiana. He played in four first-class matches for British Guiana from 1908 to 1922.

See also
 List of Guyanese representative cricketers

References

External links
 

1888 births
1941 deaths
Cricketers from British Guiana